The following is a list of Michigan State Historic Sites in Presque Isle County, Michigan. Sites marked with a dagger (†) are also listed on the National Register of Historic Places in Presque Isle County, Michigan.


Current listings

See also
 National Register of Historic Places listings in Presque Isle County, Michigan

Sources
 Historic Sites Online – Presque Isle County. Michigan State Housing Developmental Authority. Accessed May 29, 2011.

References

Presque Isle County
Tourist attractions in Presque Isle County, Michigan